Spencer Walklate (11 January 1918 – 3 April 1945) was an Australian rugby league footballer who played in the 1940s and served as a special operations serviceman who was killed in action on active service during World War II.

Playing career
Spencer "Sam" Walklate was born in Maclean, New South Wales and came to the St George Dragons in 1942 during World War II. A policeman at Darlinghurst, Walklate was a big strapping front row forward who made an immediate impact at the club with his fearless attack and defence. He played his last game for the St George on 8 April 1944 after suffering a knee injury.

War service
Walklate had enlisted in the Australian Army at the end of the 1943 season and joined an elite special-ops group sent to New Guinea, which was under Japanese occupation at the time.

Death
Listed as missing in action in mid-1945, he is believed to have been tortured and executed by the Japanese during a mission on 13 April 1945. His remains were not discovered until 2013, on Kairiru Island and were buried the following year at Port Moresby (Bomana) War Cemetery.

His name is included on the World War II Honour Roll at RSL Memorial at Bondi Junction. Spencer Walklate's brother, Eric Mervyn Walklate, was also killed in World War II.

See also
List of solved missing person cases

References

1918 births
1945 deaths
Military personnel from New South Wales
St. George Dragons players
Australian military personnel killed in World War II
Australian rugby league players
Rugby league players from New South Wales
Rugby league props
Z Special Unit personnel
Missing in action of World War II
Australian Army soldiers
People executed by Japanese occupation forces
Australian torture victims
Australian people executed abroad
Australian Army personnel of World War II
Burials at Port Moresby (Bomana) War Cemetery